Mantidae is one of the largest families in the order of praying mantises, based on the type species Mantis religiosa; however, most genera are tropical or subtropical. Historically, this was the only family in the order, and many references still use the term "mantid" to refer to any mantis. Technically, however, "mantid" refers only to members of the family Mantidae, and not the 14 remaining families of mantises. Some of the most recent classifications have promoted a number of the mantid subfamilies to the rank of family, e.g. Iridopterygidae, Sibyllidae, Tarachodidae, Thespidae, and Toxoderidae, while other classifications have reduced the number of subfamilies without elevating to higher rank.

Subfamilies and genera  
Following the major revision of the Mantodea in 2019, the Mantodea Species File includes ten subfamilies:

Choeradodinae 
The Americas, Asia
 Asiadodis Roy, 2004
 Choeradodis Serville, 1831
 †Prochaeradodis Piton, 1940

Deromantinae 
Africa
 Deromantis Giglio-Tos, 1916
 Pseudostagmatoptera Beier, 1931

Hierodulinae 
Africa, Asia, Australia 
 Archimantis Saussure, 1869
 Austromantis Sjostedt, 1918
 Austrovates Sjostedt, 1918
 Camelomantis Giglio-Tos, 1917
 Chlorocalis Stiewe, Shcherbakov & Vermeersch, 2019
 Coenomantis Giglio-Tos, 1917
 Corthylomantis Milledge, 1997
 Dracomantis Shcherbakov & Vermeersch, 2020
 Ephierodula Giglio-Tos, 1912
 Gretella Werner, 1923
 Hierodula Burmeister, 1838
 Hierodulella Giglio-Tos, 1912
 Mekongomantis Schwarz, Ehrmann & Shcherbakov, 2018
 Nullabora Tindale, 1923
 Pnigomantis Giglio-Tos, 1917
 Pseudomantis Saussure, 1869
 Rhombodera Burmeister, 1838
 Rhombomantis Ehrmann & Borer, 2015
 Sphodropoda Stal, 1871
 Stictomantis Beier, 1942
 Tamolanica Werner, 1923
 Tismomorpha Roy, 1973
 Titanodula Vermeersch, 2020
 Trachymantis Giglio-Tos, 1917
 Zopheromantis Tindale, 1924

Mantinae 

 Mantilia Roy, 1993
 Mantis Linne, 1758
 Statilia Stal, 1877

Mellierinae 
Australia
 Melliera Saussure, 1892
 Mellierella Giglio-Tos, 1915
 Rhodomantis Giglio-Tos, 1917
 Scolodera Milledge, 1989 
 Xystropeltis Rehn, 1935

Omomantinae 
 Omomantis Saussure, 1899

Orthoderinae 
 Orthodera Burmeister, 1838
 Orthoderina Sjostedt, 1918

Stagmomantinae 
The Americas
 Antemna Stal, 1877
 Hondurantemna Rodrigues, Rivera, Reid & Svenson, 2017
 Phasmomantis Saussure, 1869
 Stagmomantis Saussure, 1869
 Tauromantis Giglio-Tos, 1917

Tenoderinae 
Africa, Europe
 Alalomantis Giglio-Tos, 1917
 Cataspilota Giglio-Tos, 1917
 Epitenodera Giglio-Tos, 1911
 Paramantis Ragge & Roy, 1967
 Mantasoa Mériguet, 2005
 Mesopteryx Saussure, 1870
 Nausicaamantis Meriguet, 2018
 Notomantis Tindale, 1923
 Plistospilota Giglio-Tos, 1911
 Polyspilota Burmeister, 1838
 Prohierodula Bolivar, 1908
 Rhomboderella Giglio-Tos, 1912
 Sphodromantis Stal, 1871
 Tarachomantis Brancsik, 1892
 Tenodera Burmeister, 1838
 Tenospilota Roy & Ehrmann, 2014
 Tisma Giglio-Tos, 1917

Vatinae 

South America
 Alangularis Svenson, Medellin & Sarmiento, 2015
 Callivates Roy, 2003
 Catoxyopsis Giglio-Tos, 1914
 Chopardiella Giglio-Tos, 1914
 Heterovates Saussure, 1872
 Lobocneme Rehn, 1911
 Oxyopsis Caudell, 1904
 Parastagmatoptera Saussure, 1871
 Pseudovates Saussure, 1869
 Pseudoxyops Saussure & Zehntner, 1894
 Stagmatoptera Burmeister, 1838
 Vates Burmeister, 1838
 Zoolea Serville, 1839

See also
 List of mantis genera and species
 Flower mantis

References

External links

Key to Mantidae Genera
Tree of Life - Mantidae
Natures's Best Masked Flower Image
North American mantids
MantisOnline.eu: All about praying mantids

 
Mantodea families
Taxa named by Hermann Burmeister

tr:Mantid